Mario Vecchiato (born 24 October 1948) is a retired Italian hammer thrower. He won a silver medal at the 1971 Mediterranean Games and placed tenth at the 1971 European Championships and ninth at the 1972 Summer Olympics.

References

External links
 

1948 births
Living people
Olympic athletes of Italy
Athletes (track and field) at the 1972 Summer Olympics
Italian male hammer throwers
Mediterranean Games silver medalists for Italy
Athletes (track and field) at the 1971 Mediterranean Games
Mediterranean Games medalists in athletics